Escrick railway station served the village of Escrick, North Yorkshire, England from 1871 to 1961 on the East Coast Main Line.

History 
The station opened on 2 January 1871 by the North Eastern Railway. It closed to passengers on 8 June 1953 and closed to goods traffic in 1961.

The line was closed in October 1983, with all trains diverted onto the new section of the East Coast Main Line between Temple Hirst Junction and Colton Junction (Selby Diversion).

References

External links 

Disused railway stations in North Yorkshire
Former North Eastern Railway (UK) stations
Railway stations in Great Britain opened in 1871
Railway stations in Great Britain closed in 1953
1871 establishments in England
1961 disestablishments in England